A - B - C - D - E - F - G - H - I - J - K - L - M - N - O - P - Q - R - S - T - U - V - W - XYZ

This is a list of rivers in the United States that have names starting with the letter V.  For the main page, which includes links to listings by state, see List of rivers in the United States.

V 
Van Duzen River - California
Vedder River - Washington
Ventura River - California
Verde River - Arizona
Verdigris River - Kansas, Oklahoma
Vermilion River (Illinois River tributary) - Illinois
Vermilion River (Wabash River tributary) - Illinois
Vermilion River - Louisiana
Vermilion River - Minnesota
Vermilion River - Ohio
Vermillion River - Minnesota
Vermillion River - South Dakota
Vermillion River - Wisconsin
Vince Bayou - Texas
Virgin River - Utah, Nevada
Volga River - Iowa

V